Shujaabad  is a city and the capital of Shujabad Tehsil of Multan District in the Punjab province of Pakistan. Chenab River is situated in the west of city. Neighbouring settlements include Jalalpur Pirwala, Multan and Lodhran. Its population is about 600,000.

History 
Shujabad is a historical city which dates back to the time of its capture by Muhammad ibn Qasim in 711 AD. The name of Shujabad is derived from its Afghan ruler's name Nawab Shuja Khan, the second son of Nawab Zahid Khan who twice remained the governor (Subedar) of Multan under Ahmed Shah Durrani's rule (also known as Ahmad Shah Abdali). He founded the Shujabad city in 1750 and built the fortification wall between 1767 and 1772. He left Multan and came to Shujabad in 1772 to save his life after he was badly defeated by the Mughals who laid siege to Multan. He hid himself in the fort to save himself from the Mughal Army and died in 1775 AD and was buried outside the city in a locality known as Basti Khairpur. Old city of Shujabad was protected and made secured against the invaders with the huge and high wall all around the city by the Nawab and founder of the city Shuja Khan. Though the condition of the wall is deteriorating yet it is still in its original position. It is very much planned city at that time. The arrangement of old city is symmetrical. There are four Bazaars within the walled city i.e. Multani Bazaar, Rasheed Shah Bazaar, Rail Bazaar and Chotaka Bazaar on the names of its four respective doors (Railway Gate (open towards railway station), Multani Gate (open towards Multan), Rasheed Shah Gate (having the tomb of Rasheed Shah), Chutaka Gate (as Chutaka means crossing of four roads, four roads going on different directions from this gate). Chandni Chowk is the center of all Bazaars. In the ancient time all the gates were locked at night. Only little outlets were being used for in coming and out going. Shujabad is also very famous due to the presence of saints. Rasheed Shah was a very famous Dervish (Sufi saint) of Shujabad region and his dargah (Sufi shrine) is located within the walled city. Shujaabad is famous for its mangoes as well.

Political representation 
For National Assembly and Provisional Assembly
 NA-158
 Candidates for Elections 2018.
Rana Ejaz ahmed noon MPA 
Ibrahim Khan (PTI) MNA
Javed Ali Shah EX MNA (Pmln)
Mujahid Ali Shah Ex MPA (Pmln)

Geography and climate 
The city is located in southern Punjab at almost the exact center of Pakistan. The area around the city is flat, fertile land. The very hot weather of this region makes it ideal for agriculture. There are many canals providing water for cultivation in the region for the growth of crops such as cotton, wheat and mangoes. Dusty winds blow in the summer. Mango trees, palms / cotton / wheat / simplicity / near to nature lifestyle / is a very important quality.

Demographics 
The majority of residents speak Urdu language, Haryanvi, Mewati, Punjabi, Rangri and Sariki.

Economy 

Shujabad is an agricultural city due to its hot weather, flat land and irrigation system. The hot weather in the region make it ideal for the growth of crops like cotton, wheat, dates and mangoes. There is one civil hospital and other private hospitals in city. The city has a Court, Police Station, Rescue (1122) and Fire Brigade office.

Notable Persons 

 MUHAMMAD ASHFAQ KHAN BLOCH NEAR CANAL REST HOUSE SHUAJABAD
 Muhammad Imran Qadir
 Syed Javed Ali Shah
 Rana Muhammad Qasim Noon
 Shakir Shuja Abadi                       
 Mushtaq Ahmad Mughal

References

External links

https://www.facebook.com/National-Press-Club-Shujabad-1107368982734921/

Populated places in Multan District
1750 establishments in India
Tehsils of Punjab, Pakistan